Legden is a railway station in the town of Legden, North Rhine-Westphalia, Germany. The station lies on the Dortmund–Enschede railway and the train services are operated by Deutsche Bahn.

Train services
The station is served by the following services:

Local service  Enschede - Gronau - Coesfeld - Lünen - Dortmund

References

Railway stations in North Rhine-Westphalia